Finn Spur is a rock spur  northeast of Mount Ayres on the north side of Longhurst Plateau, in the Cook Mountains of Antarctica. It was named after Carol Finn, a geophysicist with the United States Geological Survey (USGS), who was USGS project chief on a cooperative USGS–German aeromagnetic survey over the Butcher Ridge – Cook Mountains – Darwin Névé area, 1997–98, and also performed additional aeromagnetic surveys from 1991, including seasons over the West Antarctic ice sheet from 1994 as a principal investigator and USGS project chief.

References

External links

Ridges of Oates Land